A total solar eclipse occurred on July 22, 1990. A solar eclipse occurs when the Moon passes between Earth and the Sun, thereby totally or partly obscuring the image of the Sun for a viewer on Earth. A total solar eclipse occurs when the Moon's apparent diameter is larger than the Sun's, blocking all direct sunlight, turning day into darkness. Totality occurs in a narrow path across Earth's surface, with the partial solar eclipse visible over a surrounding region thousands of kilometres wide. Totality was visible in southern Finland, the Soviet Union (including today's northern Estonia and northern Russia), and eastern Andreanof Islands and Amukta of Alaska.

In Finland the solar eclipse occurred during sunrise and enabled observation and photography without protective glasses, which was however hampered by strong clouds. The Sun was totally eclipsed in Helsinki began at 06:03:07 local time.

Related eclipses

Eclipses of 1990 
 An annular solar eclipse on January 26.
 A total lunar eclipse on February 9.
 A total solar eclipse on July 22.
 A partial lunar eclipse on August 6.

Solar eclipses 1990–1992

Saros 126

Inex series 

In the 19th century:

 Solar Saros 120: Total Solar Eclipse of 1816 Nov 19

 Solar Saros 121: Hybrid Solar Eclipse of 1845 Oct 30

 Solar Saros 122: Annular Solar Eclipse of 1874 Oct 10

In the 22nd century:

 Solar Saros 130: Total Solar Eclipse of 2106 May 03

 Solar Saros 131: Annular Solar Eclipse of 2135 Apr 13

 Solar Saros 132: Hybrid Solar Eclipse of 2164 Mar 23

 Solar Saros 133: Total Solar Eclipse of 2193 Mar 03

Tritos series

Metonic cycle

Notes

References

Photos:
 Prof. Druckmüller's eclipse photography site
 Druckmüller in Chukotka, Soviet Union
 in Russia
 in Russia (2)
 Russian scientist had no successful observation of the eclipse

1990 07 22
1990 in science
1990 07 22
July 1990 events in Europe
1990 in the Soviet Union
1990 in Finland
July 1990 events in North America